
Year 185 BC was a year of the pre-Julian Roman calendar. At the time it was known as the Year of the Consulship of Pulcher and Puditanus (or, less frequently, year 569 Ab urbe condita). The denomination 185 BC for this year has been used since the early medieval period, when the Anno Domini calendar era became the prevalent method in Europe for naming years.

Events 
 By place 

 Roman Republic 
 The Roman general Scipio Africanus and his brother Lucius are accused by Cato the Elder and his supporters of having received bribes from the late Seleucid king Antiochus III. Scipio defies his accusers, reminds the Romans of their debt to him, and retires to his country house at Liternum in Campania. However, Cato is successful in breaking the political influence of Lucius Scipio and Scipio Africanus.

 Egypt 
 The civil war between the northern and southern areas of Egypt ends with the arrest of Ankmachis by the Ptolemaic general Conanus.

 India 
 Pushyamitra Shunga assassinates the Mauryan emperor Brhadrata, which brings an end to that dynasty, after which he founds the Shunga dynasty.

Births 
 Panaetius of Rhodes, Greek philosopher (d. 110 BC)
 Publius Cornelius Scipio Aemilianus, leading general and politician of the Roman Republic. As consul he will be the commander of the final siege and destruction of Carthage and will be the leader of the senators opposed to the Gracchi (d. 129 BC)

Deaths 
 Brhadrata, Indian emperor, last ruler of the Indian Mauryan dynasty (from 197 BC)

References